Dario Beni (1 January 1889 – 2 February 1969) was an Italian professional road racing cyclist who was born in Rome, Italy. He won the first ever stage in Giro d'Italia history in 1909. In total he won three stages at the Giro d'Italia.

References

External links

1889 births
1969 deaths
Italian male cyclists
Italian Giro d'Italia stage winners
Cyclists from Rome
20th-century Italian people